Kobna ubavina (lit. Terrible Beauty, English-language title Terrible Beauty Is Born) is the third studio album, released in 2004, by the Macedonian rock band Mizar. It is the first and only album with vocalist Goran Trajkovski. The band changed their style from darkwave and punk to a type of progressive rock.

The track "Juda" was released as a single in 2003, with Pochesna strelba as a B-side, although both are earlier mixes of the tracks.

Track listing

Personnel

Mizar 
 Goran Trajkovski - vocals
 Gorazd Chapovski - guitar
 Ilija Stojanovski - bass
 Zharko Serafimovski - drums
 Vladimir Kaevski - keyboards

Guest and session musicians 
 Ivan Bejkov - double bass
 Vladimir Pop-Hristov - cello
 Cengis Ibrahim - harp
 Alfrida Tozieva - viola
 Petar Rendzov - extra guitar

References

External links
Lyrics on official site
Kobna ubavina on Discogs

Mizar (band) albums
2004 albums